Caloplaca luteominia subspecies bolanderi (ruby firedot) is an endolithic lichen, a crustose lichen that grows inside rock, between the grains, with only the ruby red fruiting bodies exposed to the air. It is in the Teloschistaceae family.

See also
List of Caloplaca species

References 

Teloschistales
Lichen species
Taxa named by Edward Tuckerman